Ptychochromis oligacanthus is a species of cichlid endemic in fresh water habitats in the western part of the Antsiranana Province in Madagascar. The population on the island of Nosy Be appears to be stable, but the mainland populations are threatened by habitat loss. It reaches a length of  TL.

References

oligacanthus
Freshwater fish of Madagascar
Fish described in 1868
Taxa named by Pieter Bleeker
Taxonomy articles created by Polbot